Braunwald is a car-free resort village in the municipality of Glarus Süd and canton of Glarus in Switzerland.

History

Braunwald is first mentioned in 1421 as Brunwald. There is evidence of summer occupation between the 12th and 15th centuries and, by 1725, a few families were living there year-round. A school was first held in 1841, and moved into its own building in 1857. The Niederschlacht Inn, built in 1856, became a famous hotel.
The opening of the Braunwald funicular in 1907 was followed by the opening of further hotels, including the Grand Hotel Bellevue (now the Märchenhotel Bellevue), the Alpina Hotel (now the Adrenalin Backpackers Hostel) and the Alpenblick Hotel (which was destroyed by fire in 2009). In the second half of the 20th century, several chair lifts and gondola lifts opened to provide access to the ski slopes above the village.

Until 1939, the village of Braunwald formed part of the municipality of Rüti, but, in that year Braunwald split off to form its own municipality. On 1 January 2011, both municipalities were reunited as part of the new municipality of Glarus Süd.

Geography

It overlooks the villages of Linthal and Rüti in the valley below. It is overlooked by the mountains of Ortstock, Höch Turm, Eggstock and Bös Fulen.

Of this area, 43.7% is used for agricultural purposes, while 28.5% is forested. Of the rest of the land, 3.2% is settled (buildings or roads) and the remainder (24.6%) is non-productive (rivers, glaciers or mountains).

Transport
Braunwald is a car-free resort village, and access to the village is via the Braunwald funicular from the village of Linthal in the valley below. The funicular links Braunwald with Linthal Braunwaldbahn station, where over 750 parking spaces are available. The station provides a convenient interchange with the main line railway, and is served by the hourly Zürich S-Bahn service S25 from Zurich.

Taxi services for transport within the village are available from Schuler Transporte and Schumi-trans. Gondola lifts and chair lifts link the village to Grotzenbüel, Kleiner Gumen, Seblengrat and Bächital, principally for winter sport activities but in some cases operating in summer as well.

Demographics
, 13.0% of the population was made up of foreign nationals. Over the last 10 years the population has decreased at a rate of -25.4%. Most of the population speaks German  (93.6%), with Serbo-Croatian being second most common ( 3.2%) and Dutch being third ( 1.2%).

In the 2007 federal election the most popular party was the SPS which received 57.9% of the vote.  Most of the rest of the votes went to the SVP with 38.2% of the vote.

The entire Swiss population is generally well educated.  In Braunwald about 70.6% of the population (between age 25-64) have completed either non-mandatory upper secondary education or additional higher education (either University or a Fachhochschule).

Braunwald has an unemployment rate of 1.2%.  , there were 40 people employed in the primary economic sector and about 15 businesses involved in this sector.  20 people are employed in the secondary sector and there are 7 businesses in this sector.  215 people are employed in the tertiary sector, with 28 businesses in this sector.

The historical population is given in the following table:

Weather
Braunwald has an average of 161.3 days of rain per year and on average receives  of precipitation. During this month there is precipitation for an average of 15.4 days. The month with the most days of precipitation is July, with an average of 16, but with only  of precipitation.

Braunwald is the municipality with the highest annual snowfall in Switzerland.

References

External links
 
 Braunwald from Glarus Süd municipal web site (in German)
 Braunwald from Braunwald tourist web site
 

Car-free villages in Switzerland
Former municipalities of the canton of Glarus
Ski areas and resorts in Switzerland
Villages in the canton of Glarus